Mighty  Power Rangers (MMPR) is a superhero television series that premiered on August 28, 1993, on the Fox Kids programming block. It is the first entry of the Power Rangers franchise, and became a 1990s pop culture phenomenon along with a large line of toys, action figures, and other merchandise. The show adapted stock footage from the Japanese TV series Kyōryū Sentai Zyuranger (1992–1993), which was the 16th installment of Toei's Super Sentai franchise. The second and third seasons of the show drew elements and stock footage from Gosei Sentai Dairanger and Ninja Sentai Kakuranger, respectively, though the Zyuranger costumes were still used for the lead cast in these two seasons. Only the mecha and the Kiba Ranger (White Ranger) costume from Dairanger were featured in the second season while only the Kakuranger mecha was featured in the third season, though the Kakuranger costumes were later used for the mini-series Mighty Morphin Alien Rangers. The series was produced by MMPR Productions and distributed by Saban Entertainment, while the show's merchandise was produced and distributed by Bandai Entertainment. The series was well known for its campy tone.

While a global storyline would continue in Power Rangers Zeo, Power Rangers Turbo, Power Rangers in Space, and Power Rangers Lost Galaxy (which could be considered respectively and unofficially as the fourth, fifth, sixth, and seventh seasons of the original series), the subsequent series would not be sequels or spin-offs in the traditional sense, having self-contained plots with no strong connection with the original series (except taking place in the same universe, not being reboots). The exceptions would be Power Rangers Dino Thunder, which could be considered as a continuation of the original classic series by having the presence of the character Tommy Oliver (the Green Ranger and later White Ranger, portrayed by Jason David Frank) as part of the regular team of Rangers of the generation of that series (in some of the other series the character only made special participations). Power Rangers SPD would also be another exception, as in this series' plot, this generation's Green Ranger, J.J Oliver, is the son of Tommy, the original Green Ranger. Another series connected to the original classic series would be Power Rangers Operation Overdrive, as one of the main villains of this series, Thrax, is the son of Rita Repulsa and Lord Zedd, main villains of the classic series.

In 2010, a remake of Mighty Morphin Power Rangers, with a revised new look of the original 1993 logo, comic book-referenced graphics, and extra alternative visual effects, was broadcast on ABC Kids, and Bandai produced brand new toys to coincide with the series. Only the first 32 of season one's 60 episodes were remade. It was the final Power Rangers season to air on ABC Kids as Haim Saban re-acquired the franchise from Disney, who took over the rights in 2002. With the beginning of Power Rangers Samurai in 2011, the franchise had moved to Nickelodeon.

The original series also spawned the feature film Mighty Morphin Power Rangers: The Movie, released by 20th Century Fox on June 30, 1995. Despite mixed reviews, it was a modest financial success, and earned a cult following. In 1997, a second film titled Turbo: A Power Rangers Movie was released as a bridge between the series Power Rangers Zeo and Power Rangers Turbo. In 2017, a reboot film based on the original series was distributed by Lionsgate, simply titled Power Rangers. Due to both the film's financial failure and Hasbro's acquisition of the franchise in 2018, another reboot is in development.

A television special titled Mighty Morphin Power Rangers: Once and Always will commemorate the 30th anniversary of Mighty Morphin Power Rangers and will premiere on Netflix on April 19, 2023, with returning cast members David Yost, Walter Jones, Steve Cardenas, Johnny Yong Bosch, Catherine Sutherland, Barbara Goodson, and Richard Steven Horvitz reprising their roles. Charlie Kersh will portray Minh, the daughter of Trini Kwan.

Series overview

Season 1 (1993–1994)
The series takes place in the fictional town of Angel Grove, California. On an exploratory mission, two astronauts discover an extraterrestrial container (referred to as a dumpster as a result of its smell) and breach the unit, inadvertently releasing the evil alien sorceress Rita Repulsa from 10,000 years of confinement. Upon her release, she and her army of evil space aliens set their sights on conquering the nearest planet—Earth. The wise sage Zordon, who was responsible for capturing Rita (and also being enemies on Zordon's home world, Eltar), later becomes aware of her release and orders his robotic assistant Alpha 5 to select five "teenagers with attitude" to defend the Earth from Rita's attacks. The five teens chosen are Jason Lee Scott, Kimberly Hart, Zack Taylor, Trini Kwan, and Billy Cranston. Zordon gives them the ability to transform into a superhuman fighting force known as the Power Rangers. This provides them with formidable abilities and an arsenal of weapons, as well as colossal assault vehicles called Zords which can combine into a giant humanoid machine known as the Megazord.

The series begins with five teenagers combating Rita and her seemingly endless array of monsters, while also dealing with typical teenage problems and clashing with local bullies Bulk and Skull. However, consecutive failures lead Rita to adopt a new method for conquering Earth and destroying the Power Rangers—by attacking them with one of their own. Using her magic, Rita kidnaps and brainwashes a local teen whose fighting skills prove to equal that of Jason's in a martial-arts tournament held in Angel Grove. The new teen, Tommy Oliver, passes Rita's tests, becoming the Green Ranger. Entrusted with Rita's Sword of Darkness, the source for the continuance of the evil spell he has fallen victim to, Tommy comes dangerously close to defeating the Power Rangers. After sabotaging the Command Center and cutting off Zordon's connection to their dimension, Tommy helps Rita strike another blow to the Rangers when the Megazord is drained of its power in battle by a solar eclipse and then blasted into a molten lava crevice. However, Alpha eventually succeeds in reestablishing connection with Zordon, who then revives the Megazord. With it, the Rangers stop Tommy's rampage on Angel Grove with his Dragonzord, and Jason ultimately defeats Tommy in a one-on-one duel by destroying the Sword of Darkness. Now free from Rita's spell, Tommy chooses to use his Green Ranger powers to assist the Rangers in defeating the evil that gave them to him in the first place, and the Dragonzord is reconfigured to enable it to help form more powerful Zord combinations alongside the other Dinozords.

As time goes on, Rita focuses on eliminating Tommy to regain the powers that she believes belong to her. Using a special wax that was touched by Tommy when he was evil, Rita uses a magic Green Candle to slowly remove his powers, returning them to her. In the end, Tommy loses his powers, but he prevents Rita from reclaiming them by transferring them to Jason who, feeling guilt for failing to protect Tommy's powers, accepts them. However, Tommy later returns to the team when the other Rangers' Power Coins are handed over to Rita in exchange for their kidnapped parents. With Zordon's help, Tommy regains his powers and successfully retrieves the other Rangers' Power Coins. However, Tommy's regained powers are only temporary and must be frequently re-charged by Zordon, who warns him that the Green Ranger's powers will ultimately fail. Despite this, Tommy remains determined to continue assisting the other Rangers as long as possible.

Season 2 (1994–1995)
Lord Zedd, Rita's superior, arrives at Rita's Moon Palace, where he takes her place and throws her into a space dumpster again. He then begins his own campaign to conquer Earth. In order for the Power Rangers to compete with Zedd's monsters, which are superior to the ones Finster made for Rita, Zordon and Alpha upgrade the Dinozords into the more powerful Thunderzords (which combine into the Thunder Megazord). However, Tommy is forced to retain use of the Dragonzord, due to his Green Ranger powers being too weak to support a new Zord.

After several defeats, Zedd's attacks on the Rangers progressively become more violent. He focuses his attention on eliminating Tommy, whom he sees as Rita's biggest mistake in giving him the Dragon Coin. The Green Ranger's powers were rapidly deteriorating, but Zedd's efforts had enhanced the process. He eventually does so with a special Green Crystal, using it to take away the Green Ranger's powers. The crystal also powers up Zedd's Dark Rangers, but when Tommy smashes it, the Dark Rangers powers are transferred back to the regular Rangers. Nevertheless, Zedd finally succeeds in taking the Green Ranger's powers (which Rita later uses to power Tommy's clone to battle against the Rangers before reclaiming it once more). Following the loss of the Green Ranger's powers, Zordon and Alpha create, in secret, a new White Ranger to aid the other Rangers in battle. The White Ranger is revealed to be Tommy, who in addition receives a new Zord, the Tigerzord, and also becomes the new leader of the Power Rangers (replacing Jason).

During the Team Ninja Trials in Angel Grove, the Rangers become friends with three teenagers from Stone Canyon: Rocky DeSantos, Adam Park and Aisha Campbell. During an ensuing battle with Zedd and a magical serpent, Rocky, Adam and Aisha discover the Rangers' identities and, having been entrusted with their secret by Zordon, the three newcomers become allies of the Rangers.

Later on, Jason, Zack and Trini are selected to represent Angel Grove at the World Peace Conference in Geneva, Switzerland, and the Rangers are faced with the task of finding replacements. To transfer the powers of the Red, Black and Yellow Rangers, they must find the Sword of Light, which is located on the Deserted Planet. Zedd pursues them across the galaxy in Serpentera, his massive personal Zord, and destroys most of the Deserted Planet. Serpentera runs out of power before being able to finish the Rangers, and they return to Earth safely with the Sword of Light. Zordon then chooses Rocky, Adam and Aisha to replace Jason, Zack and Trini as the Red, Black and Yellow Rangers, respectively.

Sometime before the power transfer, Rita had returned to Earth when Tommy made his debut as the White Ranger, and fell into the hands of Bulk and Skull, but the Rangers sent her back into space. She later returns to the Moon while the Rangers are in Australia, and with the help of Finster, she gets a special "makeover" to gain a younger and "prettier" face. She then uses a love potion on Zedd, who is in a deep sleep during his centennial re-evilizer, and he falls in love with her when he wakes up. They get married and join forces to make an even more terrible threat for the Rangers, but not even this can prepare them for what is to come.

Season 3 (1995)
Rito Revolto, Rita's skeletal brother, comes to Earth and, with the help of a group of monsters, destroys the Rangers' Thunderzords and the Tigerzord. As a result, the Dinozords are also destroyed and the Power Coins are damaged beyond repair. Undaunted, the Power Rangers seek the aid of Ninjor, alleged creator of the Power Coins, who gives them new Ninja Coins, providing them with the even more powerful Ninjazords (which combine into the Ninja Megazord) and the Falconzord.

An Australian girl named Katherine Hillard moves to Angel Grove. She befriends Kimberly, and displays an intense affection for Tommy. Later it is found out that Rita had captured Katherine and put her under a powerful spell, giving her the ability to transform into a cat as well as a cat-like monster. Under this spell, she steals Kimberly's Ninja Coin, vastly weakening and nearly killing the Pink Ranger, whose life force, like that of the other Rangers, is connected to her Ninja Coin. It is during this time that the Rangers acquire their most powerful Zords: the Shogunzords (which combine into the Shogun Megazord). Eventually, Katherine overcomes Rita's evil spell and returns the Pink Ninja Coin to Kimberly. A short time after, Kimberly gets a chance to pursue her personal athletic dreams. With Zordon's blessing, she leaves to train for the Pan Global Games, choosing Katherine to replace her as the Pink Ranger. Though her initial fear and hesitation keeps her from contributing fully to the fight against evil, Katherine eventually becomes both comfortable and capable of fulfilling her duty as a Ranger.

After several more battles, Zedd and Rita are joined by Rita's father, Master Vile. Following his failed attempts to defeat the Rangers, he reverses time, turning the Rangers into powerless children. These events culminate in the mini-series Mighty Morphin Alien Rangers and lead to the next incarnation of the franchise, entitled Power Rangers Zeo.

Characters

Power Rangers

 Jason Lee Scott  The first Red Ranger and the team's first leader. He wields the Power Sword, and pilots the Tyrannosaurus Dinozord and the Red Dragon Thunderzord. During Tommy's absence, he also wields the Dragon Dagger and commands the Dragonzord. Jason was portrayed by Austin St. John.
 Zack Taylor  The first Black Ranger. He wields the Power Axe, and pilots the Mastodon Dinozord and the Lion Thunderzord. Zack was portrayed by Walter Emanuel Jones.
 Billy Cranston  The Blue Ranger and the Blue Ninja Ranger; also becomes the longest-lasting member of the original team. He wields the Power Lance, and pilots the Triceratops Dinozord, the Unicorn Thunderzord, the Wolf Ninjazord, and the Blue Shogunzord. Billy was portrayed by David Yost.
 Trini Kwan  The first Yellow Ranger. She wields the Power Daggers, and pilots the Saber-Toothed Tiger Dinozord and the Griffin Thunderzord. Trini was portrayed by Thuy Trang.
 Kimberly Hart The first Pink Ranger and the first Pink Ninja Ranger. She wields the Power Bow, and pilots the Pterodactyl Dinozord, the Firebird Thunderzord, and the Crane Ninjazord. Kimberly was portrayed by Amy Jo Johnson.
 Tommy Oliver  The Green Ranger; later the White Ranger, the White Ninja Ranger, and the team's second leader. He wields the Dragon Dagger (as the Green Ranger) and the Saba Sword (as the White Ranger), and pilots the Dragonzord, the White Tigerzord, the Falcon Ninjazord, and the White Shogunzord (with Katherine). Tommy was portrayed by Jason David Frank.
 Rocky DeSantos  The second Red Ranger and the Red Ninja Ranger. He pilots the Red Dragon Thunderzord (after Jason), the Ape Ninjazord, and the Red Shogunzord. Rocky was portrayed by Steve Cardenas.
 Adam Park  The second Black Ranger and the Black Ninja Ranger. He pilots the Lion Thunderzord (after Zack), the Frog Ninjazord, and the Black Shogunzord. Adam was portrayed by Johnny Yong Bosch.
 Aisha Campbell  The second Yellow Ranger and the Yellow Ninja Ranger. She pilots the Griffin Thunderzord (after Trini), the Bear Ninjazord, and the Yellow Shogunzord. Aisha was portrayed by Karan Ashley.
 Katherine "Kat" Hillard The second Pink Ranger and the second Pink Ninja Ranger. She pilots the Crane Ninjazord (after Kimberly) and the White Shogunzord (with Tommy). Kat was portrayed by Catherine Sutherland.

Supporting characters
 Zordon An inter-dimensional being trapped in a time warp, he is the wise mentor of the Rangers, who also bestowed their powers. 10,000 years ago, Zordon led the fight against the forces of evil, specifically Rita. Finally, he was able to imprison the evil witch and her minions in a dumpster on the moon. He once had a corporeal human form, but now appears as a floating head in an energy tube. He is initially voiced and portrayed by David Fielding, and later voiced by Robert L. Manahan.
 Alpha 5 A multi-functional semi-sentient automaton from Edenoi, Alpha was Zordon's trusted robotic assistant, responsible for the daily operations and upkeep of the Command Center. He is portrayed by Sandi Sellner and is voiced by Richard Steven Horvitz.
 Farkas "Bulk" Bulkmeier and Eugene "Skull" Skullovitch Two bullies at Angel Grove High School. Bulk, the leader, was prone to dragging Skull into wacky schemes, which usually failed miserably and ended in humiliation or injury. In the second season, the two decide to discover the identities of the Power Rangers after they were saved by the Rangers in "The Mutiny". In the third season, they enroll in the Junior Police Force. Thanks to the efforts of their superior officer, Lt. Stone, the duo become good-natured goofs. They are portrayed by Paul Schrier (Bulk) and Jason Narvy (Skull).
 Ernie The owner and proprietor of the Youth Center, he could often be seen behind the counter of the Juice Bar, and would sometimes dispense advice to the teens. He is portrayed by Richard Genelle.
 Mr. Caplan The stern principal of Angel Grove High School, who often encouraged his students in their extracurricular activities. He wore a toupée, which serves as a running gag during seasons 1 and 2. He is portrayed by Henry Cannon (uncredited).
 Ms. Appleby A teacher at Angel Grove High School. She is portrayed by Royce Herron (uncredited).
 Angela The girl of Zack's affections, he was constantly attempting to impress and go on a date with her, much to her annoyance. She would often demean Zack for his attempts. She only appears in season 1. She is portrayed by Renee Griggs (uncredited).
 Curtis Zack's cousin who appears very early on in season 2, and was phased out of the show shortly after Zack's departure. He is portrayed by Joel Rodgers (uncredited).
 Richie Another teen introduced early in season 2 to aid Ernie with running the juice bar and who was planned to be Trini's love interest. Like Curtis, he too was phased out of the show following Trini's departure. He is portrayed by Maurice Mendoza (uncredited).
 Jerome Stone A Police Lieutenant with the Angel Grove Police Department. He is portrayed by Gregg Bullock.
 Prince Dex/Masked Rider A warrior from Alpha's home planet of Edenoi who leads a resistance movement against its ruthless dictator Count Dregon, an acquaintance and rival of Lord Zedd. He is portrayed by Ted Jan Roberts.
 Ninjor The creator of the original 6 Power Coins and Dinozords that were used by the original 6 Power Rangers, even though it was Zordon who distributed them. He is portrayed by Hideaki Kusaka and voiced by Kim Strauss.
 Wild West Rangers The Old West ancestors of Rocky, Adam, Aisha and Billy, who temporarily obtain Ranger Powers when Kimberly is transported to their time. As Rangers, the Wild West Rangers have outfits identical to those of their descendants, except for the addition of cowboy attire.

Antagonists
 Rita Repulsa The main antagonist for the series. Rita Repulsa is a sorceress who was imprisoned in a dumpster on the Moon with her minions until some astronauts accidentally freed her. She is portrayed by Machiko Soga in Season 1, and Carla Perez onward. She was voiced by Barbara Goodson.
 Lord Zedd The main antagonist starting in season 2, along with Rita. Using his staff, Lord Zedd can turn anything into a monster. He was portrayed by Ed Neil (uncredited) and voiced by Robert Axelrod.
 Goldar A manticore-themed creature who is Rita's main henchman. He is portrayed by Takashi Sakamoto, Kazutoshi Yokoyama, and Danny Wayne Stallcup (former two uncredited). He was voiced by Kerrigan Mahan.
 Rito Revolto A Gashadokuro-themed creature who is Rita's brother and a secondary antagonist/henchman for season 3. He is portrayed by Kenichi Endō and Danny Wayne Stallcup. He was voiced by Bob Papenbrook.
 Scorpina  A scorpion-themed female and partner of Goldar who becomes a scorpion-themed monster when enlarged. She is portrayed by Ami Kawai in Season 1, and Sabrina Lu in Season 2 (1 episode only). She was voiced by Wendee Lee.
 Finster  A leprechaun-themed creature who is Rita's chief monster maker in season 1. By season 3, he still occasionally makes monsters. He was portrayed by Takako Iiboshi (uncredited) and voiced by Robert Axelrod.
 Squatt One of Rita's henchmen. A short, fat, blue hobgoblin-themed creature, he is usually blamed for Rita or Zedd's failures. He was portrayed by Minoru Watanabe (uncredited) and voiced by Michael Sorich.
 Baboo One of Rita's henchmen. A tall, vampire-like creature who wears a monocle. He usually chastises Squatt when Rita's plans fail and is often blamed. He was portrayed by Hideaki Kusaka (uncredited) and voiced by Dave Mallow.
 Master Vile Rita and Rito's father and a secondary antagonist in season 3. He was portrayed by Hideaki Kusaka and voiced by Simon Prescott (both uncredited).
 Lokar A floating, demonic, ethereal, he is an old friend of Rita's and she called on him for a favor to defeat the Rangers. He was portrayed by Masahiko Urano (uncredited) and voiced by Robert Axelrod.
 Putty Patrollers The warriors made of clay who act as Rita Repulsa's foot soldiers, the Putties are often sent to wear the Rangers down before a monster battle, as well as for sabotage and other special missions. The original Puttys were based on Golem Soldiers, which were the Sentai Counterpart on Zyuranger.
 Z-Putties In Season 2, Lord Zedd upgrades the Putty design, completely replacing Rita's original design. Zedd's Putties (or Z-Putties for short) are superior to the original Putties and are more expendable. However, the Z-Putties also have a big weakness—striking the Z-logo on their chests causes the Z-Putties to explode into pieces. The Z-Putties were the first group of Power Ranger exclusive foot soldiers.
 Tenga Warriors The crow-like soldiers that are able to speak. They are introduced in Season 3 when Rito takes them with him to the Moon as a wedding gift, and replace Zedd's Putties. The Rangers normally use their Ninja Ranger powers to fight them. Unlike the Putties, the Tenga Warriors are not expendable and they return to the Moon when defeated. The Tengas originated in Mighty Morphin Power Rangers: The Movie (going by the name "Tengu Warriors") under the command of Ivan Ooze. The name changed between the movie and show was because of copyright complications with the movie's producer 20th Century Fox.. Like the Z-Putties, the Tenga's were the second group of foot soldiers exclusive to Power Rangers.

Episodes

Season 1 (1993–94)

Season 2 (1994–95)

Season 3 (1995)

Production

Conception 
While on a business trip to Japan, Haim Saban came across a broadcast of Choudenshi Bioman on TV Asahi, later learning of a popular French-language dub aired on Canal+. Based on the franchise's popularity both in and outside of its native country, Saban realized there was potential for an American adaption. He and his business partner Shuki Levy quickly produced a pilot entitled Bio-Man in August 1986, which featured an early appearance by actor and martial artist Mark Dacascos in a leading role. According to Levy, they "shopped it around for at least five years, but nobody wanted it." Saban only found success in 1992, when he found a network executive familiar with Super Sentai, Fox Kids' Margaret Loesch, that during her time with Marvel Productions saw partner Stan Lee trying to sell the Sun Vulcan series to various television stations such as ABC, CBS, NBC, and HBO. Loesch's boss at Fox did not have much faith in the project, only financing a pilot that if unsuccessful, could even lead to Loesch's dismissal. Levy and Saban then began working on the pilot using footage from the latest Sentai season, Kyōryū Sentai Zyuranger, entitling the pitch Galaxy Rangers. A test screening with an audience of children was successful, and eventually, the pilot was picked up by Fox Kids for a 40-episode order, after which point it would be determined by the network whether or not to renew the series for additional episodes.

Casting 
Due to the action-oriented nature of the show, many of the lead actors cast had background in martial arts, dance, or other physically intensive activities. Amy Jo Johnson (Kimberly) and David Yost (Billy) were former competitive gymnasts, Austin St. John (Jason) held a second-degree black belt in Taekwondo, and a first-degree black belt in Judo. Walter Emanuel Jones (Zack) was a dancer and trained in Taekwondo, and Thuy Trang (Trini) was a kung fu practitioner. Actor Jason Narvy (Skull) originally auditioned for the role of Billy.

Filming 
The series was shot on location in Santa Clarita and Los Angeles, California. Recurring locations included Grant High School, Placerita Canyon State Park, Puddingstone Reservoir, and Frank G. Bonelli Regional Park. The House of the Book at Brandeis-Bardin Institute was used as the exterior location for the Command Center. Due to its unusual, futuristic architecture; the building had previously been used in the films Star Trek VI: The Undiscovered Country and The Lawnmower Man.

As part of the initial licensing agreement between Saban and Toei Company, the producers of the Super Sentai, additional footage and insert shots of the villain characters (particularly those played by Machiko Soga, Ami Kawai, and Hideaki Kusaka) were filmed in order to allow more in-depth, extensive scenes of the villains who would be unable to interact with the main cast due to the nature of the show. The additional footage included close-ups of the actor speaking English-language lines phonetically in order to make the necessary dialogue looping more seamless.

Episodes 39 & 40 (The two part episode Doomsday) were originally intended as the season (and potentially series) finale, with the producers' intending to bring in actress Machiko Soga to reprise her role as Rita in new footage where she would interact directly with the main cast. Due to the unprecedented success of the show and its merchandising, Fox Kids ordered an additional 25 episodes. Since most of the available stock footage from Zyuranger had been depleted for use in the first 40 episodes of Season 1, Saban commissioned Toei to produce 25 new monster costumes and new battle footage using the existing Zyuranger suits. Saban was able to produce 25 additional episodes using new monster suits. This new footage has been referred to as "Zyu2" by Power Rangers fans. Saban used the first 15 for the rest of Season 1 (episodes 41–60), then the remaining suits and footage for the first 13 episodes of Season 2. This became problematic, however, when the Thunderzords were introduced, as they were from Gosei Sentai Dairanger, which resulted in Saban splicing together footage from both "Zyu2" and Dairanger for the Megazord battles in these early Season 2 episodes.

Following production of Season 2's first 20 episodes, Austin St. John, Thuy Trang and Walter Emanuel Jones left the show over contract disputes. To disguise this incident, a combination of body doubles, voice doubles and stock footage were used to continue featuring the characters Jason, Trini and Zack for eight episodes. The voice doubles were also used for the Ranger costume scenes in the last several episodes that the three actors filmed. The subplot of Jason, Trini and Zack leaving Angel Grove for the World Peace Conference was made to bridge the transition to their replacements.

During the later portion of Season 2 (following Rocky, Adam and Aisha's introduction to the series), the production moved to Sydney, Australia for roughly four months to shoot Mighty Morphin Power Rangers: The Movie, which was released the following summer before the start of Season 3.

Reception and controversy

Depictions of violence
Despite the success of the series, it was also subject to much controversy from parents who felt the show was too violent for young children. The show had aired before television stations issued content warnings such as parental guidance or fit for viewing persons twelve years or over, the V-chip, and television ratings. In the US, numerous complaints were sent to the Federal Communications Commission (FCC). In 1993, the Canadian broadcast rights to Mighty Morphin Power Rangers were jointly purchased by the YTV cable channel, and the series played to a receptive audience every weekday afternoon on YTV, the latter trailing the American broadcast by several months. However, due to complaints sent to the recently formed Canadian Broadcast Standards Council and a negative assessment from that body over the show's violent content, YTV removed the series from their line-up in November. Despite not actually being a member of the CBSC, YTV complied and pulled the series before the end of its first season; Global (which was a CBSC member) ultimately did the same. While a phone-in poll was conducted to see if viewers wanted MMPR back on YTV, no further installments of the Power Rangers franchise aired on the network until 2011's Power Rangers Samurai, although commercials for toys and videos were still advertised on it. Later Disney-era versions of the series were broadcast on ABC Family.

In 1994, the New Zealand Broadcasting Standards Authority (BSA) upheld several complaints from members of the public about the level of violence in the show. The main concern of those complainants was that the show portrayed violence as the primary means of resolving conflict, and that this was influencing children to behave more violently more frequently. Immediately following the BSA decision, the second season of the show was all but cancelled by Television New Zealand. New Zealand is the only country in the world where this show has been prematurely withdrawn from public broadcast to date. DVD and video releases of the more-recent Power Rangers series that were filmed in New Zealand can be found at The Warehouse, although general sales through video stores and other retailers are scarce. Later series in the Power Rangers franchise, such as Power Rangers: Mystic Force and Power Rangers: Jungle Fury, were filmed in New Zealand, but the programs were still not shown in the country, until 2011, when Samurai premiered.

In mid-October 1994, the murder of Silje Redergård by two of her young friends prompted Swedish-owned TV3 to pull MMPR from its broadcast schedule in all of its market countries. However, MMPR was not related to the event.

Poor work conditions
As a non-union production, members of the original cast were reportedly subject to low pay, long hours, unfair contracts, and a hostile work environment and, as many of the cast were young, aspiring actors, they had no agents or lawyers to protect their interests and they themselves had limited experience in the entertainment industry. Additionally, despite the show's financial success, members of the original cast did not receive royalty payments for re-runs of episodes in which they starred. 

Austin St. John, Thuy Trang and Walter Emmanuel Jones were the first to leave the series, citing low pay, in the middle of the second season, and St. John was homeless for a time after leaving. While the reasons for their departure was debated for many years, St. John would confirm in 2014 that the departure was due to the low salaries the stars were being paid; he stated "I could have worked the window at McDonald's and probably made the same money the first season. It was disappointing, it was frustrating, it made a lot of us angry." The actors were receiving non-union pay, in the amount of about $60,000 per year without any compensation for merchandising for the show, which was estimated to be worth about $1 billion. Trang, St. John, and Jones were all represented by agent Ingrid Wang, and they requested more compensation and union recognition. 
Amy Jo Johnson left the series in the middle of the third season for the same reason, along with concerns over her safety, having almost been set on fire during the filming of Mighty Morphin Power Rangers: The Movie. Amy Jo Johnson later expressed regret that she and the other cast members did not join the three departing cast members in calling for union wages and recognition, wondering if all of them standing together may have led to a different result. According to Johnson, St. John, Jones and Trang had wanted the show to become unionized, leading to them being replaced by Steve Cardenas, Johnny Yong Bosch, and Karan Ashley, respectively.

Within the show, the actors' departure was explained by their characters being chosen as representatives in an international "Peace Conference" in Switzerland. Trang, St. John, and Jones released a joint statement about their departure:

Allegations of homophobia
David Yost was the last of the original Ranger actors to leave the series (during Power Rangers Zeo), citing homophobic attitudes from production staff, prompting him to unsuccessfully undergo conversion therapy in an effort to change his sexuality. In a 2010 interview with fan blog "No Pink Spandex", Yost stated that he walked off set one day because "[he] was called 'faggot' one too many times." He also stated that the producers would often ask other cast members what they thought about his homosexuality, and this made him uncomfortable as well. Shortly after this interview, producer Scott Page-Pagter stated that Yost left over a pay dispute and that he didn't know why Yost made the allegations of homophobia; he further stated that Yost did not get along with any of the crew.

Other
In Malaysia, the phrase "Mighty Morphin" was censored and edited out from the logo due to the word "morphin" being too similar to the name of the drug morphine.

Awards and nominations

Broadcast and home media
Reruns of Mighty Morphin Power Rangers were aired on all networks such as Fox/ABC Family, Toon Disney (part of the Jetix block) and ABC Kids for a short time, but returned on TeenNick's The '90s Are All That block in honor of the series' 20th anniversary in 2013.

VHS, DVD and streaming

Between 1994 and 1996, Saban Home Entertainment, in association with PolyGram Video and Warner Home Video, released videotapes of the series in the United States. In 2000, 20th Century Fox Home Entertainment released seven compilation VHS tapes. In 2012, Shout! Factory released 19 discs to Comic-Con International and a 20-disc set exclusively to Time Life of all three seasons and Mighty Morphin Alien Rangers. In that same year, Shout! Factory reissued the 19 discs to wider retail. They also released two volumes for both seasons 1 and 2 of the series, as well as the complete third season. In January 2014, the complete series, as well as the remaining 17 seasons in the entire Power Rangers franchise, was released in 98-disc set. The series has also been released on VHS in the UK and Australia, and Region 2 DVD. The first 30 episodes of season 1 have been released to Region 4 DVD.

As of 2023, the series is now streaming on Netflix.

Video games
The following video games are either based on the television series or feature characters from the series.

 Mighty Morphin Power Rangers (Super Nintendo Entertainment System, Game Boy) (1994)
 Mighty Morphin Power Rangers (Sega Genesis, Game Gear) (1994)
 Mighty Morphin Power Rangers (Sega CD) (1994)
 Mighty Morphin Power Rangers: The Movie (SNES, Genesis, Game Boy, Game Gear) (1995)
 Mighty Morphin Power Rangers: The Fighting Edition (SNES) (1995)
 Power Rangers: Super Legends (PlayStation 2, Nintendo DS) (2007)
 Mighty Morphin Power Rangers: Mega Battle (PlayStation 4, Xbox One) (2017)
 Power Rangers: Legacy Wars (iOS, Android) (2017)
 Power Rangers: Battle for the Grid (PlayStation 4, Xbox One, Nintendo Switch) (2019)

Comic books

Several comic book series were based on Mighty Morphin Power Rangers. From 1994 to 1995, Hamilton Comics produced three separate series totaling 13 issues altogether. Marvel Comics produced two series, the first with seven issues based on the second season and the second with five issues called Mighty Morphin Power Rangers: Ninja Rangers/VR Troopers which was a flip book with adventures based on the third season on one side and of VR Troopers on the other. The Power Rangers also appeared in the Masked Rider comic book from Marvel. In March 2016, BOOM! comics released a new Mighty Morphin Power Rangers comic series based on the original series but serves as a reboot taking place in the modern world. In July 2017, a second series titled Go Go Power Rangers was released and takes place before Tommy joins the team.

Films
 Mighty Morphin Power Rangers: The Movie (1995)
 Power Rangers (2017)

See also

 Kyōryū Sentai Zyuranger
 Gosei Sentai Dairanger
 Ninja Sentai Kakuranger

References

External links

 Official Power Rangers Website
 

Mighty Morphin Power Rangers
1990s American high school television series
1990s American science fiction television series
1990s fads and trends
1993 American television series debuts
1995 American television series endings
ABC Kids (TV programming block)
American children's action television series
American children's adventure television series
American children's fantasy television series
American children's science fiction television series
American superhero television series
English-language television shows
Fox Kids
Fox Broadcasting Company original programming
Martial arts television series
Ninja fiction
Mighty Morphin
Science fantasy television series
Superhero television series
Television controversies in the United States
Television series about size change
Television series about teenagers
Television series by Saban Entertainment
Television shows filmed in Los Angeles
Television shows filmed in Santa Clarita, California
Television shows set in California
Television shows adapted into comics
Television shows adapted into video games
Witchcraft in television
Television series created by Haim Saban
Television series created by Shuki Levy